Sir Thomas Dalyell, 11th Baronet, (9 August 1932 – 26 January 2017), known as Tam Dalyell, was a Scottish Labour Party politician who was a member of the House of Commons from 1962 to 2005. He represented West Lothian from 1962 to 1983, then Linlithgow from 1983 to 2005. He formulated what came to be known as the "West Lothian question", on whether non-English MPs should be able to vote upon English-only matters after political devolution. He was also known for his anti-war, anti-imperialist views, opposing the Falklands War, the Gulf War, the War in Afghanistan and the Iraq War.

Early life and career

Dalyell was born in Edinburgh, and raised in his mother Nora Dalyell's family home, the Binns, near Linlithgow, West Lothian; his father Gordon Loch CIE (1887–1953) was a colonial civil servant and a scion of the Loch family. Highland Clearances facilitator James Loch (1780–1855) was an ancestral uncle. Loch (and his son) took his wife's surname in 1938, and through his mother Dalyell inherited the baronetcy of Dalyell. However, he never used the title.

Dalyell was educated at the Edinburgh Academy and Eton College. He did his national service with the Royal Scots Greys from 1950 to 1952, as an ordinary trooper, after failing his officer training. He then went to King's College, Cambridge, to study mathematics, but switched to history. He became chairman of the Cambridge University Conservative Association and vice-president of the Cambridge Union Society. Cambridge economist Joan Robinson encouraged him to stay for a year after completing his history degree to take an additional degree in economics, which he did and later described as "the hardest work I ever did, much harder than being a PPS". He then trained as a teacher at Moray House College in Edinburgh and taught at Bo'ness Academy for three years and was Director of Studies on the ship school Dunera 1961–1962.

In 1969 Dalyell became a columnist for New Scientist magazine, contributing Westminster Scene (later Westminster Diary) until his retirement in 2005. This provided "a conduit for researchers to speak to Parliament and vice versa", covering many subjects of public concern including industrial diseases, data protection, chemical weapons and the environment.

Political career

Having been educated by left-wing economists at Cambridge, Dalyell said that he became a socialist because of the level of unemployment in Scotland. He joined the Labour Party in 1956, following the Suez Crisis. After being unsuccessful as a parliamentary candidate for Roxburgh, Selkirk and Peebles in 1959, he became a Member of Parliament in June 1962, when he defeated William Wolfe of the Scottish National Party in a hard-fought by-election for West Lothian. From 1983 onwards, he represented Linlithgow (when the new town of Livingston formed its own constituency) and easily retained the seat. He became Father of the House after the 2001 general election, when Former Prime Minister Sir Edward Heath retired from the House of Commons. He was a nominated Member of the European Parliament from 1975 to 1979, and a member of the Labour National Executive from 1986 to 1987 representing the Campaign group.

Dalyell's independent stance in Parliament ensured his isolation from significant committees and jobs. His early career was promising and he became Parliamentary Private Secretary (PPS) to Richard Crossman. He annoyed a number of ministers and was heavily censured by the Privileges Committee for a leak about the biological weapons research establishment, Porton Down, to the newspapers (though he said that he thought the draft minutes of the Select Committee on Science and Technology were in the public domain). When Labour were defeated in 1970, his chances of senior office were effectively over. He was opposed to Scottish devolution and was the first to come up with the "West Lothian question", although it was actually named by Conservative MP Enoch Powell. He continued to argue his own causes: in 1978–79, he voted against his own government over 100 times, despite a three-line whip.

In the 1990s, Dalyell asked the Lord Advocate, Lord Rodger of Earlsferry, to grant diplomatic immunity to Lester Coleman, a co-author of Trail of the Octopus, so that he could give evidence in the Lockerbie bombing trial in Scotland; the US Government had indictments against Coleman, accusing him of passport fraud and perjury. Allan Stewart, a former Scottish Office minister and Conservative MP for Eastwood, also said that Coleman should be granted immunity so he could testify in Scotland. The Lord Advocate rejected Dalyell's plea, saying that the Home Office and the English courts had jurisdiction over the demand of the US government's extradition demand regarding Coleman, and that the Crown Office and the Scottish Office had no authority over the case. Dalyell later said, "I had contact with Les Coleman 10 years ago. In my opinion, though he has a chequered history, I take him seriously."

Dalyell was vocal in his disapproval of actions he deemed imperialistic.  Beginning with his opposition to Britain becoming involved in the Indonesia–Malaysia confrontation in 1965, he contested almost every British military intervention, arguing against Britain's involvement in the Aden Emergency, the Falklands War (especially the sinking of the General Belgrano), the Gulf War, the Kosovo War and the 2003 invasion of Iraq. "I will resist a war with every sinew in my body", he said. Dalyell was also a supporter of the Chagossians in their campaign to return to Diego Garcia after being expelled in 1968. When invited by a television journalist to rank Tony Blair among the eight Prime Ministers he had observed as a parliamentarian, he cited Blair's policies in Kosovo and Iraq as reasons for placing his party leader at the bottom of the list. He was also a strong presence in Parliament concerning Libya and led no fewer than 17 adjournment debates on the Lockerbie bombing, in which he repeatedly demanded answers by the Government to the reports of Hans Köchler, United Nations observer at the Lockerbie trial.

In February 2003, he became the first Father of the House to be ordered to leave the chamber, after asking questions about the government's "dossier" on weapons in Iraq. Following his outspoken opposition to the 2003 invasion of Iraq and criticism of the Government, Downing Street suggested that he might face withdrawal of the Labour whip. In May, the American magazine Vanity Fair reported Dalyell indirectly as having said that Prime Minister Tony Blair was unduly influenced by a "cabal of Jewish advisers". He specifically named Lord Levy, who was Blair's official representative in the Middle East, and Labour politicians Peter Mandelson (whose father was Jewish) and Jack Straw (whose great-grandfather was Jewish). Mandelson said that "apart from the fact that I am not actually Jewish, I wear my father's parentage with pride". Dalyell denied accusations that the remarks were anti-Semitic. In March 2003, regarding the 2003 invasion of Iraq, Dalyell accused Blair of being a war criminal. He stated that "since Mr Blair is going ahead with his support for a US attack without unambiguous UN authorisation, he should be branded as a war criminal and sent to The Hague".

On 7 March 2003, Dalyell was elected as Rector of the University of Edinburgh. After a three-year term, he was succeeded in 2006 by Mark Ballard. It was announced on 13 January 2004 that Dalyell would stand down from Parliament at the next general election, and he left the House of Commons in April 2005 after 43 years as a Member of Parliament. He had been Scotland's longest-serving MP since the resignation of Bruce Millan in 1988. He was succeeded as Father of the House by Alan Williams. In 2009, The Daily Telegraph reported that Dalyell had submitted an expenses claim for £18,000 for three bookcases just two months before his retirement from the House of Commons. Dalyell claimed that this was a legitimate expense to which he was entitled; the House of Commons' Fees Office released £7,800.

Dalyell was given an honorary doctorate by Heriot-Watt University in 2011.

Personal life and death

Dalyell married Kathleen Wheatley, a teacher, on 26 December 1963; she was the elder daughter of John Wheatley, Lord Advocate and Labour MP for East Edinburgh. They have a son Gordon Wheatley Dalyell, and a daughter Moira, both of whom are lawyers. In his retirement, and for some years previously, he contributed obituaries to The Independent. In 2011 he published his autobiography, The Importance of Being Awkward. The dedication is "To the men and women of West Lothian – Labour, SNP, Conservative, Liberal, Communist – who, whatever their political opinions, were kind to me in all sorts of ways over 43 years as their representative in the House of Commons."

On 26 January 2017, Dalyell died after a short illness at the age of 84.

Bibliography 
 The Case of Ship-Schools (1960), 
 Ship-School Dunera (1963), 
 Devolution: The End of Britain? (1977), 
 One Man's Falklands (1982), 
 A Science Policy for Britain (1983), 
 Thatcher's Torpedo (1983), 
 Misrule (1987), 
 Dick Crossman: A Portrait (1989), 
 The Importance of Being Awkward: The Autobiography of Tam Dalyell (2011), 
The Question of Scotland ~ Devolution and After (2016),

See also 

 Hans Köchler's Lockerbie trial observer mission
 The Maltese Double Cross – Lockerbie

References

External links 

 The Papers of Tam Dalyell at the Churchill Archives Centre
 
 Tam Dalyell, former MP Linlithgow on www.theyworkforyou.com
 Westminster Diary: Tam Dalyell Column from New Scientist magazine
 Catalogue of Dalyell's papers, mostly collected while PPS to Richard Crossman, held at the Modern Records Centre, University of Warwick

1932 births
2017 deaths
20th-century Scottish male writers
21st-century Scottish writers
Alumni of King's College, Cambridge
Alumni of the University of Edinburgh
Anglo-Scots
Baronets in the Baronetage of Nova Scotia
British people of the Falklands War
European democratic socialists
Fellows of the Royal Scottish Geographical Society
Labour Party (UK) MEPs
MEPs for the United Kingdom 1973–1979
Members of the European Parliament for Scottish constituencies
National Union of Railwaymen-sponsored MPs
Obituary writers
People educated at Edinburgh Academy
People educated at Eton College
People from West Lothian
Politics of West Lothian
Rectors of the University of Edinburgh
Royal Scots Greys soldiers
Scottish Labour MPs
Scottish autobiographers
Scottish biographers
Scottish political writers
Scottish schoolteachers
The Independent people
UK MPs 1959–1964
UK MPs 1964–1966
UK MPs 1966–1970
UK MPs 1970–1974
UK MPs 1974
UK MPs 1974–1979
UK MPs 1979–1983
UK MPs 1983–1987
UK MPs 1987–1992
UK MPs 1992–1997
UK MPs 1997–2001
UK MPs 2001–2005